Mikel Dufrenne (9 February 1910, in Clermont, Oise – 10 June 1995, in Paris) was a French philosopher and aesthetician. He is known as an author of existentialism and is particularly noted for the work The Phenomenology of Aesthetic Experience (1953, in French as Phénoménologie de l'expérience esthétique).

He encountered the work of Karl Jaspers while being a prisoner of war in a camp with Paul Ricœur. Dufrenne and Ricœur later collaborated on a book on Jaspers.

Works
 Karl Jaspers et la philosophie de l'existence, 1947
 Phénoménologie de l'expérience esthétique, 1953; Eng. tr., The Phenomenology of Aesthetic Experience (1973)
 La personnalité de base, 1953
 La Notion d'a priori, 1959; Engl. tr., The Notion of the A Priori (1966)
 Jalons, 1966
 La philosophie du néopositivisme, 1967
 Pour l'homme, 1968
 (with Paul Ricœur) Karl Jaspers et la philosophie de l'existence (1974)
 Esthétique et philosophie (two volumes, 1976)

Further reading
Robert Magliola, "Part II, Chapter 3: Mikel Dufrenne," Phenomenology and Literature (Lafayette, Indiana: Purdue University Press, 1977; 1978), pp. 142–173 (this influential work explained for the English-language academic world the role of Dufrenne in the formulation of "phenomenological literary theory and criticism"; it also supplied, for hermeneutical philosophy, a chapter-by-chapter description and critique of Dufrenne's monumental Phénoménologie de l'expérience esthétique). See 
Jean-Baptiste Dussert and Adnen Jdey (ed.), Mikel Dufrenne et l'esthétique: entre phénoménologie et philosophie de la Nature, Rennes (France), Presses Universitaires de Rennes, 2016 (this book is the first collection of essays devoted to all the aspects of Dufrennes's aesthetic).

1910 births
People from Oise
20th-century French writers
1995 deaths
Academic staff of the University of Poitiers
World War II prisoners of war held by Germany
20th-century French male writers
French male non-fiction writers
20th-century French philosophers